Alpha Epsilon Iota was a professional fraternity for women in the field of medicine.

History
Alpha Epsilon Iota was established as a medical fraternity for women on February 26, 1890 at the University of Michigan. Its Founders were:
 Lotta Ruth Arwine-Suverkrup
 May Belle Stuckey Reynolds
 Ada Fenimore Bock
 Anna Ward Croacher
 Lily Mac Gowan-Fellows

Founded prior to the turn of the 20th Century, Alpha Epsilon Iota was thereby one of the earliest of the professional medical fraternities to serve women. It quickly expanded to a Beta chapter at the University of Chicago that same year, cementing its national intentions.

By the turn of the century two additional chapters had formed, with seven more added by 1910. Later, growth slowed for the most part, with a flurry of new groups in the 1920, but no new chapters after 1949.

The fraternity dissolved as a national organization in March 1963. Some chapters continued on as local entities. Minnesota's Epsilon chapter remained active through the 1970s at which time there was a marked expansion of female enrollment in the growing medical school there, but ΑΕΙ sold its properties in 1979, splitting then into two groups, the AEI Foundation which continues to provide scholarships, and a networking organization called Minnesota Women Physicians.

Traditions and insignia
The colors of Alpha Epsilon Iota were black, white, and green.

The fraternity flower is the White Carnation.

The official badge is described as a "black enameled faceted pentagon, having a gold star at the apex with an emerald inset. The three upper facets contained the Greek letters Α Ε Ι in gold, the two lower facets, a gold serpent."

The biannual publication is The Directory Journal.

Six grades of members were created:  Collegiate, Graduate, Honorary, Affiliate, Non-graduate, and Associate.

Chapters
Chapter information from Baird's Manual (20th), which reports there were approximately 4,000 members.

References

Defunct fraternities and sororities
Professional medical fraternities and sororities in the United States
Student organizations established in 1890
1890 establishments in Michigan